Dyea is a former town in the U.S. state of Alaska. A few people live on individual small homesteads in the valley; however, it is largely abandoned. It is located at the convergence of the Taiya River and Taiya Inlet on the south side of the Chilkoot Pass within the limits of the Municipality of Skagway Borough, Alaska. Confidence man and crime boss Soapy Smith, famous for his underworld control of the neighboring town of Skagway in 1897–98 is believed to have had control of Dyea as well.

The port at Dyea had shallow water, while neighboring Skagway had deep water.  Dyea was abandoned when the White Pass and Yukon Route railroad chose the White Pass Trail (instead of the alternative Chilkoot Trail), which began at Skagway, for its route.

Use of the name Dyea for its present location first occurred in 1886, when John J. Healy (1840-1908) and Edgar Wilson (1842-1895) opened their trading post there.  Prior to that year, only a small hunting and fishing cabin had existed at the location.  Prior to 1886, Dyea or Dei-yi [phonetic spelling] had been the second half of the name Chilkoot Dei-yi [Chilkoot-owned Trail].  Prior publications state that Dyea was derived from the words for “to pack” [yaa] or “carrying place” [yaa yé].  However, the presence of the initial \d\ sound in Dyea casts doubt on those latter possibilities, and suggests that the first syllable was in fact dei (as in dei-yi).

Chilkoot Trail and Dyea Site is a U.S. National Historic Landmark.

Dyea is now within the Klondike Gold Rush National Historical Park. All that remains are a number of foundations surrounded by scraps of lumber and metal, 3 cemeteries, including one where almost every person buried died on the same date in an avalanche on the gold rush trail, and the ruins of the wharf. Visitors can usually spot brown bears, black bears, and eagles. Brown bears tend to use the Dyea inlets to feed during salmon spawning season (July–August).

Demographics

Dyea appeared one time on the U.S. Census in 1900 as an unincorporated village. It has since been annexed into the city of Skagway.

References

External links

Guide to Dyea, Alaska from ExploreNorth
Dyea page at Klondike Gold Rush National Historic Park

Geography of the Municipality of Skagway Borough, Alaska
Ghost towns in Alaska
Historic American Engineering Record in Alaska
Klondike Gold Rush
Mining communities in Alaska
Ghost towns in the United States
Ghost towns in North America